Nizhny Lukh is a rural locality (a settlement) in Dobryansky District, Perm Krai, Russia. The population was 464 as of 2010. There are 6 streets.

Geography 
Nizhny Lukh is located 51 km north of Dobryanka (the district's administrative centre) by road. Olkhovka is the nearest rural locality.

References 

Rural localities in Dobryansky District